The Billboard Latin Music Award for Latin Jazz Album of the Year was an honor that was presented annually at the Billboard Latin Music Awards, a ceremony which honors "the most popular albums, songs, and performers in Latin music, as determined by the actual sales, radio airplay, streaming and social data that shapes Billboard's weekly charts". Latin jazz is a form of jazz music which incorporates various sounds from Latin America.

The accolade for Latin Jazz Album of the Year was first presented at the inaugural Billboard Latin Music Awards in 1994 to Uruguayan musician Roberto Perera's Dreams & Desires (1992). From 1994 to 1998, only winners were announced at the conferences. Nominees were first presented in 1999 after Billboard began the Latin Music Awards on Telemundo. Cuban musician Arturo Sandoval is the most awarded artist with five wins. His records, Danzón (Dance On) (1994) and Hot House (1998), are both winners of the category, and also received the Grammy Award for Best Latin Jazz Album.  Latin Soul by Poncho Sanchez is the only record to have been nominated more than once. It was nominated in 2000 and won the award in 2001. Chucho Valdés holds the record for the most nominations without a win, with four. The accolade was last presented in 2008 and discontinued a year later.

Recipients

See also
Grammy Award for Best Latin Jazz Album
Latin Grammy Award for Best Latin Jazz/Jazz Album

References

Latin Jazz Album of the Year
Awards established in 1994
Awards disestablished in 2008
Jazz awards
 
Album awards